Rho guanine nucleotide exchange factor 9 is a protein that in humans is encoded by the ARHGEF9 gene.

Function 

ARHGEF9 belongs to a family of Rho-like GTPases that act as molecular switches by cycling from the active GTP-bound state to the inactive GDP-bound state. These proteins are key regulators of the actin cytoskeleton and are involved in cell signaling.[supplied by OMIM]

Interactions 

ARHGEF9 has been shown to interact with GPHN and SMURF1.

References

External links

Further reading